The Bollywood Brass Band is the first album by The Bollywood Brass Band.

Of the seven pieces (of which two are also provided as remixes), five are from Indian films ("Kehna Hi Kya" and "(Ek Ho Gaye) Hum Aur Tum" from the Tamil film Bombay, "Hawa Hawa" from Pop, "Pardesi Pardesi" from the Bollywood film Raja Hindustani, and "Mehndip Laga Ke Rakhna" from the Bollywood film Dilwale Dulhania Le Jayenge), one ("Gur Nalon Ishk Mitha") is a traditional Punjabi melody, and one ("Loay Loay Aaja Mahi") is by Muzammal Safri.

Track listing
"Loay Loay Aaja Mahi" (Safri)
"Gur Nalon Ishk Mitha" (trad. Punjab–Sagoo)
"Kehna Hi Kya" (Rahman–Mehboob; arr. Moore)
"(Ek Ho Gaye) Hum Aur Tum" (Rahman–Mehboob)
"Hawa Hawa" (Ashraf)
"Pardesi Pardesi" (Shrava–Samir)
"Mehndi Laga Ke Rakhna" (Jatin-Lalit–Bakhshi)
"Gur Nalon Ishk Mitha" [remix]
"Kehne Hi Kya" [remix]

Arrangements
1–3 & 6: Sarha Moore
4 & 7: Kay Charlton
5: Shyam Brass Band & Gregg Moore
8: Sambhangra remix by Joe Cohen & Larry Whelan
9: Snake Eyes remix by Sanjeve

(Recorded at the Dairy, Brixton.)

Personnel
Sarha Moore — soprano saxophone, alto saxophone, percussion
Joe Cohen — soprano saxophone, tenor saxophone, percussion
Kay Charlton — trumpet
Will Embliss — trumpet
Ros Davies — trombone
Dave Jago — trombone
Johnny Kalsi — dhol
Philippe d'Amonville — drums, percussion
Nick Cattermole — bass drum, tabla, percussion
Alice Kinloch — sousaphone
Mark Allan — baritone saxophone

1999 albums
The Bollywood Brass Band albums